Vangueriopsis lanciflora is a species of flowering plants in the family Rubiaceae. The species has the largest distribution area of the genus and occurs in Central and South Tropical Africa (D.R.Congo to Tanzania and South Africa).

References

External links 
 World Checklist of Rubiaceae

lanci
Flora of the Democratic Republic of the Congo
Flora of Tanzania
Flora of South Africa